Paul Tiffany is a senior lecturer at the Haas School of Business at the University of California, Berkeley. He is the author of The Decline of American Steel, How Management, Labor and Government Went Wrong (New York: Oxford University Press, 1988) and Business Plans for Dummies.

Tiffany holds a BA from Loyola University, an MBA from Harvard Business School and a PhD from the Haas School of Business at the University of California, Berkeley.

External links
 Berkeley Haas Profile
 Business Plans For Dummies Profile
Tiffany’s Business Educators Member Profile

Loyola Marymount University alumni
Haas School of Business faculty
Living people
Year of birth missing (living people)
Haas School of Business alumni
Harvard Business School alumni